Vyacheslav Chernyshov (born 16 September 1937) is a Russian diver. He competed in the men's 3 metre springboard event at the 1960 Summer Olympics.

References

External links
 

1937 births
Living people
Russian male divers
Soviet male divers
Olympic divers of the Soviet Union
Divers at the 1960 Summer Olympics
Divers from Moscow